Anita Schwaller (born 2 May 1975) is a Swiss snowboarder. 

She was born in Innsbruck, Austria. She competed at the 1998 Winter Olympics, in halfpipe. She won a gold medal in halfpipe at the FIS Snowboarding World Championships 1997.

References

External links 
 

1975 births
Living people
Sportspeople from Innsbruck
Swiss female snowboarders
Olympic snowboarders of Switzerland
Snowboarders at the 1998 Winter Olympics
20th-century Swiss women